The Macon Athletics were a minor league baseball team based in Macon, Missouri. In 1911, the Macon Athletics played as members of the short–lived 1911 Class D level Missouri State League, hosting home games at Stephens Park.

History
Minor league baseball began in Macon, Missouri in 1911. The Macon Athletics played as charter members of the Class D level Missouri State League. The 1911 Missouri State League began play in its first season as a five–team league. The Brookfield Hustlers, Jefferson City Senators, Kirksville Osteopaths and Sedalia Cubs joined Macon as charter members.

Macon began play as the league opened on May 11, 1911. The Missouri State League had immediate issues as the Brookfield Hustlers franchise folded on May 19, 1911. Shortly after, the Brookfield Hustlers folded and the Sedalia Cubs franchise moved to Brookfield on May 24, 1911. When the Jefferson City Senators folded from the four–team league on June 2, 1911, their demise caused the Missouri State League to fold on June 5, 1911. Macon was in 2nd place with a 10–8 record under manager Brooks Gordon when the league permanently folded. Macon finished just 0.5 game behind the 1st place Brookfield Cubs, who finished with an 11–8 record.

On May 25, 1911, the Macon Athletics and Kirksville Osteopaths played a 20–inning game. Kirksville won the game 2–1.

The 1911 Macon Athletics were the only minor league team based in Macon, Missouri to date.

The ballpark
The Macon Athletics were noted to have played 1911 minor league home games at Stephens Park. Still in use today as a public park, Stephens Park is located on Pearl Street, Macon, Missouri.

Year–by–year record

Notable alumni
The roster and statistics for the 1911 Macon Athletics are unknown.

References

External links
Baseball Reference

Baseball teams established in 1911
Defunct minor league baseball teams
Professional baseball teams in Missouri
Baseball teams disestablished in 1911
Defunct baseball teams in Missouri
Missouri State League teams
Macon County, Missouri